, often abbreviated to TJPW, is a Japanese joshi puroresu or women's professional wrestling promotion founded in 2012 as a sister promotion of DDT Pro Wrestling. Initially running alongside other shows such as live music and other idol performances, it became its own standalone promotion starting on February 28, 2015.  TJPW's biggest show of the year is the annual January 4th "Ittenyon" show held at Korakuen Hall.

As of 2020, TJPW is promoted under the CyberFight banner as a sister promotion to both DDT Pro Wrestling and Pro Wrestling Noah.

History

Formation (2012–2013) 
On June 4, 2012, Tokyo Joshi Pro was announced by DDT Pro Wrestling. Set to be run by former Ice Ribbon and NEO Japan Ladies Pro-Wrestling promoter and booker Tetsuya Kodo and wrestler Nozomi, the promotion was established in late 2012 and thus a recruitment process began for wrestlers. Four of the first wrestlers recruited were Miyu Yamashita, Shoko Nakajima, Kanna and Chikage Kiba. The training of the wrestlers was mostly handled by Nozomi herself, with help from DDT wrestler Kyohei Mikami. Nozomi left DDT on November 30, 2012, but on the same day the trainees were introduced to the public in a press conference and it was announced they would debut in 2013. The trainees were required to follow three rules - no drinking, no smoking, and no boyfriends.

Early years (2013–2015) 
Tokyo Joshi Pro Wrestling's debut show took place on January 30, 2013 at Akihabara Twin Box in Tokyo. The show featured just two matches, a sambo exhibition between trainee Chikage Kiba and DDT referee and former sambo competitor Daisuke Kiso, and a singles match between trainees Miyu Yamashita and Kanna. The show did not use a wrestling ring, and instead all matches took place on training mats, similar to the Ice Ribbon promotion in its early years. Along with wrestling matches, the debut show featured live music from idol units. As TJP's roster was very small at the start, most of their early shows followed this same formula and only ran small venues. Entry to their first few shows was free as a way of introducing themselves to a bigger audience, and their first paid show was held on April 26. As their roster of trainees expanded in 2014, TJPW began including more matches on their cards, and began using a ring. They also ran a show with an appearance from voice actress/wrestler Ai Shimizu in November 2014. TJPW held its first full show without an idol performance on February 28, 2015 at Shinjuku Face. At the show, Ai Shimizu and Saki Akai confirmed they would be competing with the promotion regularly, and more trainees debuted at the show.

Rise in popularity (2016–present) 
On January 4, 2016, TJPW held its first ever show in Korakuen Hall, a famed wrestling venue in puroresu. Main evented by Miyu Yamashita defeating Shoko Nakajima to become the first ever Tokyo Princess of Princess Champion, it also featured the debut of Yuu and an appearance from American wrestler Candice LeRae. In the spring of 2016, Ai Shimizu and Erin announced their departure from the promotion, however, the summer was a success for the promotion, and TJPW earned a broadcasting deal to be shown on idol-centric channel Pigoo.

On January 4, 2017, TJPW held its second annual Korakuen show, main evented by Yuu retaining the Tokyo Princess of Princess title over Shoko Nakajima. On May 29, an audition was held for four young wrestlers to form a wrestling/idol group to be known as the "Up-Up Girls". On July 20, four women were picked and began training to wrestle shortly after. On December 4, the Up-Up Girls debuted with an idol performance, but didn't appear in ring until January 4, 2018.

On January 4, 2018, TJP's third annual Korakuen show proved to be a success, drawing over 1000 fans for the first time ever. The show was also broadcast on AbemaTV for the first time, as well as DDT's streaming service DDT Universe. The show was main evented by TJPW ace Miyu Yamashita defeating Reika Saiki to win back the Tokyo Princess of Princess Championship. On February 28, the TJPW show from Shinjuku Face was once again broadcast on AbemaTV, and it was announced Abema had picked up TJPW to broadcast it regularly. This also marked the end of TJPW being broadcast on Pigoo. On November 1, 2018, the three trainee rules were officially bought to an end, allowing wrestlers to drink, smoke and have relationships on their own accord.

The 2019 January 4 show was once again a success, drawing 1,300 fans to Korakuen Hall.

On July 16, 2019, TJPW announced, via their Twitter account, a new title called the International Princess Championship. They also announced that the Tokyo Princess of Princess Championship and the Tokyo Princess Tag Team Championship would be dropping "Tokyo" from their names.

On March 31, 2023, TJPW will hold their first event in the United States in Los Angeles, California at the Globe Theater.

Roster

Wrestlers

Alumni

Notable guests
 Rina Shingaki
 Aja Kong
 Thunder Rosa
 Mika Iwata
 Riho
 Ram Kaicho
 Su Yung
 Sareee

Championships and accomplishments

Current championships

Other accomplishments

References

2012 establishments in Japan
Japanese women's professional wrestling promotions
Professional wrestling in Tokyo
CyberAgent
DDT Pro-Wrestling
Tokyo Joshi Pro-Wrestling